Marquess of Casa Fuerte is a hereditary title in the Peerage of Spain granted in 1708 by Philip V to Juan de Acuña on his merits as Captain General of the Royal Armies. Acuña later became the 37th viceroy of New Spain, between 1722 and 1734.

Marquesses of Casa Fuerte (1708)

 Juan de Acuña y Bejarano, 1st Marquess of Casa Fuerte
 Joaquín José de Acuña y Figueroa, 2nd Marquess of Casa Fuerte
 Juan Manuel de Acuña y Vázquez-Coronado, 3rd Marquess of Casa Fuerte
 Francisco Xavier de Acuña y Prado, 4th Marquess of Casa Fuerte
 Joaquín de Acuña y Prado, 5th Marquess of Casa Fuerte
 Antonio María de Acuña y Fernández-Miranda, 6th Marquess of Casa Fuerte
 Manuel Lorenzo de Acuña y Fernández-Miranda, 7th Marquess of Casa Fuerte
 Manuel Antonio de Acuña y Dewitte, 8th Marquess of Casa Fuerte
 María del Carmen Lucía de Acuña y Dewitte, 9th Marchioness of Casa Fuerte
 Pedro Álvarez de Toledo y Acuña, 10th Marquess of Casa Fuerte
 Illán Álvarez de Toledo y Lèfebvre, 11th Marquess of Casa Fuerte
 Julio Heredia y Halcón, 12th Marquess of Casa Fuerte
 Juan Illán Álvarez de Toledo y Girau, 13th Marquess of Casa Fuerte
 Cayetana Álvarez de Toledo y Peralta-Ramos, 14th Marchioness of Casa Fuerte

See also
Viceroyalty of New Spain

References

Grandees of Spain
Marquesses of Spain
Lists of Spanish nobility
Noble titles created in 1708